Bryce is an unincorporated community in Milford Township, Iroquois County, Illinois, United States.

Geography

References

Unincorporated communities in Illinois
Unincorporated communities in Iroquois County, Illinois